Andrew Schauble (born 17 November 1976) is a former Australian rules football player.

For over a decade, he was a consistent player in defence for both the Collingwood Football Club and the Sydney Swans. After being struck down by injury in 2004 and struggling to recapture his solid form, he was restricted to only 4 games in 2005 and struggled to break into the young Sydney lineup. Following Sydney's premiership win in 2005 (which he was not a member of) Schauble retired from professional football at 28 years of age. He travelled overseas and spent 10 years as a Management consultant in Dubai and around the Middle East, particularly focusing on work around Leadership and Talent. He then returned to Australia having started BAT Logic, a Rowing equipment and consulting business which has seen significant success at Elite and Olympic level.

References

External links

1976 births
Living people
Bob Skilton Medal winners
Sydney Swans players
Collingwood Football Club players
Australian people of German descent
People educated at Xavier College
Australian rules footballers from Victoria (Australia)